The elktoe (Alasmidonta marginata) is a species of freshwater mussel, an aquatic bivalve mollusk in the family Unionidae, the river mussels. This species is found in southeastern Canada and the eastern United States. Like many mussels, it is threatened by water pollution from agriculture, industry, and other development, such as acid mine drainage and sedimentation. It may be extinct in Oklahoma.

References

Alasmidonta
Molluscs of North America
Bivalves described in 1818
Taxonomy articles created by Polbot